The Queen's Award for Enterprise: Innovation (Technology) (1979) was awarded on 21 April 1979, by Queen Elizabeth II.

Recipients
The following organisations were awarded this year.

 Fawley Refinery for new solvent in lube oil refining.
 Decca Radar for "Clearscan" marine radar clarification device.
 GEC Computers of Borehamwood, Hertfordshire for the design of the GEC 4000 series minicomputers.

References

Queen's Award for Enterprise: Innovation (Technology)
1979 awards in the United Kingdom